Bilenke may refer to the following places in Ukraine:

Bilenke, Donetsk Oblast, urban-type settlement in Donetsk Oblast
Bilenke, Kherson Oblast, village in Skadovsk Raion, Kherson Oblast
Bilenke, Luhansk Oblast, village in Krasnodon Raion, Luhansk Oblast
Bilenke, Odessa Oblast, village in Bilhorod-Dnistrovskyi Raion, Odessa Oblast
Bilenke, Zaporizhzhia Oblast, village in Zaporizhzhia Raion, Zaporizhzhia Oblast
Bilenke Pershe, village in Zaporizhzhia Raion, Zaporizhzhia Oblast